The Love of the Nightingale is an opera in two acts by Richard Mills. The libretto by Timberlake Wertenbaker is based on her play of the same name. It is an adaptation of the ancient Greek legend of the rape of Philomela by her brother-in-law Tereus, and the gruesome revenge undertaken by Philomela and her sister Procne.

It premiered on 10 February 2007 at His Majesty's Theatre, Perth, Western Australia, in a co-production of Perth International Arts Festival, West Australian Opera, Queensland Music Festival, Opera Queensland, Queensland Performing Arts Centre and Victorian Opera. The Perth production received four Helpmann Awards in 2007: for Best Music Direction to Richard Mills; Best Female Performer in an Opera to Emma Matthews; Best Male Performer in a Supporting Role in an Opera to James Egglestone; and Best Female Performer in a Supporting Role in an Opera to Orla Boylan. The production was shown later that year at the Playhouse, QPAC, Brisbane, and at Her Majesty's Theatre, Melbourne, with Richard Gill conducting.

In October 2011, Opera Australia produced the opera at the Sydney Opera House with Emma Matthews (Philomele), Anke Höppner (Procne), Elizabeth Campbell (Niobe), Richard Anderson (Tereus), the composer conducting.

Roles

Synopsis
The play is a myth about men and women and the condition and experience of women in a patriarchy: fate, sexual conflict, suffering, female desire, the Apollonian and Dionysian and metamorphosis are its elements, but in the words of the drama, "We cannot rephrase it for you. If we could, why would we bother to show you the myth?"

Act 1

Act 2

Differences between play and opera
Themes: The Love of the Nightingale by Timberlake Wertenbaker positions the viewer to consider specifically the abuse of women and authority by men, and their supposed inability to "ask questions" and tendency to block out all forms of criticism. The play takes a far more feminist outlook on the Ancient Greek myth. The opera's thematic function can be considered to not specifically be the abuse of women and authority by men, but rather the general abuse of power and the lack of criticism of authority in society. The concept that violence stems from silence is also dealt with in the opera, with greater scrutiny than in the play.

Plot: Minor plot details are changed in the opera. The role of Niobe's servant is truncated as well as the majority of dialogue being truncated from the play.

Awards

!colspan=3 style="border-top: 5px solid #FFF179;"|Helpmann Awards

References

External links

Review (Sydney 2011) by Stephen Carnell, Stage Whispers

English-language operas
Operas
2007 operas
Greek mythology
Operas by Richard Mills
Operas based on works by Sophocles
Operas based on plays